Koçören is a village in Defne district, Hatay Province, Turkey. as of 2011.

References

Populated places in Hatay Province
Towns in Turkey
Defne District